Eudora  is an email client that was used on the classic Mac OS, Mac OS X, and Microsoft Windows operating systems. It also supported several palmtop computing platforms, including Newton and the Palm OS. In 2018, after being years out of print, the software was open-sourced by the Computer History Museum.

History
Eudora was developed in 1988 by Steve Dorner, who worked at the Computer Services Organization of the University of Illinois at Urbana–Champaign. The software was named after American author Eudora Welty, because of her short story "Why I Live at the P.O."; Dorner rearranged the title to form the slogan "Bringing the P.O. to Where You Live" for his software. Although he regretted naming it after the still-living author because he thought doing so was "presumptuous", Welty was reportedly "pleased and amused" by Dorner's tribute.

Eudora was acquired by Qualcomm in 1991. Originally distributed free of charge, Eudora was commercialized and offered as a Light (freeware) and Pro (commercial) product. Between 2003 and 2006 the full-featured Pro version was also available as a "Sponsored mode" (adware) distribution. In 2006 Qualcomm stopped development of the commercial version and sponsored the creation of a new open-source version based on Mozilla Thunderbird, code-named Penelope, later renamed to Eudora OSE. Development of the open-source version stopped in 2010 and was officially deprecated in 2013, with users advised to switch to the current version of Thunderbird.

Eudora (6.0.1) added support for Bayesian filtering of spam with a feature called SpamWatch. Eudora (6.2) added a scam watch feature that flags suspicious links within emails in an attempt to thwart phishing. Eudora (7.0) added ultra-fast search, which finds any emails using single or multiple criteria in seconds.

Eudora has support for "stationery", a standard message or reply prepared ahead of time to a common question. Eudora stores emails in a modified mbox format (*.mbx), which uses plain text files instead of a database as Microsoft Outlook does. This allows the user to back up portions of their email correspondence without backing up the entire database.

Eudora supports the POP3, IMAP and SMTP protocols. Eudora also has support for SSL and, in Windows, S/MIME authentication, allowing users to sign or encrypt email communications for greatest security.

Eudora is noteworthy for its extensive variety of settings to customize its behavior, many of which are not available in the user interface but are accessed using x-eudora-setting URIs that must be pasted into a message and clicked.

At one time, Eudora also offered a webmail service at eudoramail.com. This service was run by Lycos as part of Mailcity, later renamed Lycos Mail. In 2006, Eudoramail addresses for users were still working (and were redirected to Lycos Mail accounts), but new users could no longer sign up for the service.

Eudora for Windows never had any form of support for character encoding and was hardcoded to declare every email sent as encoded iso-8859-1, regardless of the actual content, and displayed every incoming email using the system encoding (one of the Windows encodings, depending on the language version of the system). This created problems for users corresponding in languages other than Western European ones and, later on, for everybody as UTF-8 became more and more popular. At least two third-party plugins exist that can convert characters that also exist in iso-8859-1, and it's also possible to run it with "Mime-proxy", but depending on a specific user's needs and due in part to the internal limitations of Eudora they may only offer a partial solution.

On May 22, 2018, after five years of discussion with Qualcomm, the Computer History Museum acquired full ownership of the source code, the Eudora trademarks, copyrights, and domain names. The transfer agreement from Qualcomm also allowed the Computer History Museum to publish the source code under the BSD open source license. The Eudora source code distributed by the Computer History Museum is the same except for the addition of the new license, sanitization of "bad words" found mostly in comment sections of the code and the removal of third-party software that neither the museum nor Qualcomm had the right to distribute.

In 2018, a "small team" started working on repairing Eudora to update it for modern use, using  crowd funding to facilitate their effort, branded as Hermes Mail.

Initial focus was "a 'software bridge' to mediate between QUALCOMM Eudora 7 for Windows and modern OpenSSL" in response to the Heartbleed vulnerability and resulted in the release of updated cryptographic DLL files.

See also
Comparison of email clients
Eudora Internet Mail Server

References

External links 
 
 Pandora Mail, an e-mail client intended to replicate the functionality of Eudora
 Hermes Messenger - open source fork of Eudora

Classic Mac OS email clients
MacOS email clients
Qualcomm software
Windows email clients
Discontinued software
Software using the BSD license